Little Jack is a 6,745-foot-elevation mountain summit in the North Cascades Range of Washington, United States. It is located within the Pasayten Wilderness. It is situated one mile south of its namesake Jack Mountain, west of Crater Mountain, and east of Ross Lake. Like many North Cascade peaks, Little Jack is more notable for its large, steep rise above local terrain than for its absolute elevation. In the early 1900s, the Forest Service built the Little Jack Trail for the purpose of grazing pack animals on the meadows of Little Jack Mountain. The name "Jack" honors Jack Rowley, a gold prospector in the area during the late 1800s, who was credited with finding gold at Ruby Creek.

Climate
Little Jack is located in the marine west coast climate zone of western North America. Most weather fronts originate in the Pacific Ocean, and travel east toward the Cascade Mountains. As fronts approach the North Cascades, they are forced upward by the peaks of the Cascade Range, causing them to drop their moisture in the form of rain or snowfall onto the Cascades (Orographic lift). As a result, the west side of the North Cascades experiences high precipitation, especially during the winter months in the form of snowfall. During winter months, weather is usually cloudy, but, due to high pressure systems over the Pacific Ocean that intensify during summer months, there is often little or no cloud cover during the summer. Because of maritime influence, snow tends to be wet and heavy, resulting in high avalanche danger. Precipitation runoff from the mountain drains into the Skagit River.

Geology
The North Cascades features some of the most rugged topography in the Cascade Range with craggy peaks, ridges, and deep glacial valleys. The history of the formation of the Cascade Mountains dates back millions of years ago to the late Eocene Epoch. With the North American Plate overriding the Pacific Plate, episodes of volcanic igneous activity persisted.  In addition, small fragments of the oceanic and continental lithosphere called terranes created the North Cascades about 50 million years ago. Little Jack Mountain is part of the Little Jack terrane. Outcrops of granite and fine-grained mica schist can be found on the top of Little Jack Mountain. During the Pleistocene period dating back over two million years ago, glaciation advancing and retreating repeatedly scoured the landscape leaving deposits of rock debris. The "U"-shaped cross section of the river valleys are a result of recent glaciation. Uplift and faulting in combination with glaciation have been the dominant processes which have created the tall peaks and deep valleys of the North Cascades area.

Gallery

See also

 Geography of the North Cascades

References

Landforms of Whatcom County, Washington
Mountains of Washington (state)
Cascade Range
North American 2000 m summits